Soda gembira (lit. 'happy soda') is an Indonesian drink. It is made up of carbonated water, condensed milk, syrup and ice.

Soda gembira is a popular beverage in Indonesia. It is usually served during iftar in Ramadan, and at wedding receptions, alongside foods including bakso, nasi goreng, rendang, and soto.

See also

Cuisine of Indonesia
List of Indonesian drinks
Carbonated water
Rose water
Bandung (drink)

References

Indonesian drinks
Street food
Street food in Indonesia
Non-alcoholic drinks
Non-alcoholic mixed drinks